The 2020 Aotearoa Music Awards was the 55th holding of the annual ceremony, renamed the Aotearoa Music Awards featuring awards for musical recording artists based in or originating from New Zealand. It took place on 15 November 2020 at Spark Arena in Auckland and was hosted by Jesse Mulligan, Sharyn Casey, and Jayden King. The awards show was broadcast live nationally on The Edge TV from 7pm until 8:30pm, and Three from 8:30pm until 10:30pm.

Nominees and winners
Winners are listed first and highlighted in boldface.

References

External links

New Zealand Music Awards, 2019
Music Awards, 2019
Aotearoa Music Awards
November 2019 events in New Zealand